This is a list of years in Uzbekistan.

20th century

21st century

 
Uzbekistan-related lists
Uzbekistan
History of Uzbekistan